William A. Attley (born 5 April 1938) is a former Irish trade unionist and football referee.

Born in Rathcoole, Dublin, Attley studied at the National College of Industrial Relations.  He became active in the Workers' Union of Ireland (WUI), being elected as a branch secretary in 1968, then Deputy General Secretary in 1977 and General Secretary from 1982.  In 1990, he led a merger of the WUI with the Irish Transport and General Workers' Union, forming SIPTU (Services, Industrial, Professional and Technical Union), serving as joint General President until 1994, then as General Secretary until his retirement in 1998.

Outside trade unionism, Attley was active in the Labour Party, and was a keen football referee, ultimately working with UEFA to recruit and train referees, and in his retirement becoming chief referee assessor for the Football Association of Ireland.

References

External links 
 
 

1938 births
Living people
Republic of Ireland football referees
Trade unionists from County Dublin
People from Rathcoole, County Dublin
Sportspeople from South Dublin (county)
Alumni of the National College of Ireland